The 2018–19 Fresno State Bulldogs women's basketball team represents California State University, Fresno during the 2018–19 NCAA Division I women's basketball season. The Bulldogs, led by fifth year head coach Jaime White, play their home games at the Save Mart Center and are members of the Mountain West Conference. They finished the season 19–13, 11–7 in Mountain West play to finish in fourth place. They advanced to the semifinal  of the Mountain West women's tournament where they lost to Boise State. They received an at-large bid to the WNIT where they lost to Pacific in the first round.

Roster

Schedule

|-
!colspan=9 style=| Exhibition

|-
!colspan=9 style=| Non-conference regular season

|-
!colspan=9 style=| Mountain West regular season

|-
!colspan=9 style=| Mountain West tournament

|-
!colspan=9 style=| WNIT

See also
 2018–19 Fresno State Bulldogs men's basketball team

References

Fresno State Bulldogs women's basketball seasons
Fresno State
Fresno
Fresno
Fresno State